Count Anton Günther I of Schwarzburg-Sondershausen (9 January 1620 – 19 August 1666) was the ruling Count of Schwarzburg-Sondershausen from 1642 until his death in 1666.

Life 
Count Anton Günther I was the son of the Count Christian Günther I of Schwarzburg-Sondershausen (1578-1642) and his wife Countess Anna Sibille (1584-1623), daughter of Count  Albert VII of Schwarzburg-Rudolstadt.

After his father's death, he and his brothers Louis Günther II and Christian Günther II divided Schwarzburg-Sondershausen.  Anton Günther I received most of Lower Schwarzburg-Sondershausen, except for a few districts that went to Louis Günther II.

He did much for the churches and schools and laid the foundation stone of the church in Sondershausen that replaced the one that had burned down in 1621.  In 1657, the parish and school buildings burned down; he rebuilt those as well.

Marriage and issue 
Anton Günther I married on 29 October 1644 with Mary Magdalene (1622-1689), a daughter of Count Palatine George William of Zweibrücken-Birkenfeld.  They had the following children:
 Anna Dorothea (1645-1716), married Henry IV of Reuss-Greiz (1650-1686)
 Christian William I (1647-1721), Count and from 1697 the Prince of Schwarzburg-Sondershausen
 Clara Juliana (1648-1739)
 Sophie Eleanor (1650-1718), Deaness at Quedlinburg
 Anton Günther II (1653-1716), Count and from 1697 the Prince of Schwarzburg-Sondershausen-Arnstadt
 Mary Magdalene (1655-1727)
 George Frederick or Rudolf (1657)
 George Ernest (1658-1659)
 Louis Günther III (1660)
 Johanne Elisabeth (1662-1720)

References 
 Friedrich Apfelstedt: Das Haus Kevernburg-Schwarzburg von seinem Ursprunge bis auf unsere Zeit, Arnstadt, 1890
 Dr. Kamill von Behr: Genealogie der in Europa regierenden Fürstenhäuser, Leipzig, 1870

House of Schwarzburg
Counts of Schwarzburg-Sondershausen
1620 births
1666 deaths
17th-century German people